The 2016 WGC-Dell Match Play was the 18th WGC-Dell Match Play Championship, played March 23–27 at Austin Country Club in Austin, Texas. It was the second of four World Golf Championships in 2016. The Championship was won by Jason Day, it was his second WGC-Match Play win in three years.

Field
The field consisted of the top 64 players available from the Official World Golf Ranking on March 13. However, the seedings are based on the World Ranking on March 20.

Henrik Stenson (ranked 7 on March 13, personal reasons) and Jim Furyk (ranked 15, wrist surgery) did not compete, allowing entry for Patton Kizzire (ranked 65) and Thorbjørn Olesen (ranked 66).

Nationalities in the field

Past champions in the field

Format
In 2014 and earlier editions, the championship was a single elimination match play event. A new format was introduced in 2015, and the championship now starts with 16 groups of four players playing round-robin matches, on Wednesday through Friday. The top 16 seeded players are allocated to the 16 groups, one in each group. The remaining 48 players are placed into three pools (seeds 17–32, seeds 33–48, seeds 49–64). One player is randomly selected from each pool to complete each group.

In 2015, there were no halved matches in group play with extra holes played to determine the winner for each match if necessary. In 2016, all group play matches were limited to 18 holes with one point awarded for a win and one-half point for a halved match. Ties for first place in a group were broken by a sudden-death stroke play playoff, beginning on hole 1.

The winners of each group advanced to a single-elimination bracket on the weekend, with the round of 16 and quarterfinals on Saturday, and the semifinals, finals, and consolation match on Sunday.

Rank – Official World Golf Ranking on March 20, 2016.

Results

Pool play
Players were divided into 16 groups of four players and played round-robin matches Wednesday to Friday.
Round 1 – March 23    
Round 2 – March 24     
Round 3 – March 25

Notes: Round 1

Of the 32 matches played, 9 were "upsets" with the lower seeded player beating the higher seeded player and 6 matches were halved. These included top seeds #5 Rickie Fowler, #8 Dustin Johnson, #11 Branden Grace, and #12 Hideki Matsuyama losing matches and #4 Bubba Watson, #6 Adam Scott, and #10 Danny Willett halving matches.

Notes: Round 2

Of the 32 matches played, 5 were upsets with the lower seeded player beating the higher seeded player and 7 matches were halved. These included top seeds #10 Danny Willett and #13 Sergio García losing matches and #5 Rickie Fowler, #7 Justin Rose, and #15 Brandt Snedeker halving matches. There were 13 players that had perfect 2–0–0 records, including the top three seeds: Jordan Spieth, Jason Day, and Rory McIlroy.

Notes: Round 3

Of the 32 matches played, 10 were upsets with the lower seeded player beating the higher seeded player and 4 matches were halved. These included top seeds #4 Bubba Watson, #6 Adam Scott, and #7 Justin Rose losing matches and #3 Rory McIlroy and #5 Rickie Fowler halving matches. Four groups went to sudden-death playoffs, each involving two players, with three ending after one hole and the fourth ending on the second hole. Six golfers advanced with perfect 3–0–0 records: #1 Jordan Spieth, #2 Jason Day, #9 Patrick Reed, #14 Zach Johnson, #16 Louis Oosthuizen, and #30 Bill Haas. Two golfers conceded their matches early, Paul Casey conceded to Jason Day after six holes due to illness and Daniel Berger conceded Matt Fitzpatrick at the start of the match due to a wrist injury suffered on the 18th hole on Thursday, when he clipped the rock wall and missed the ball while trying to hit his second shot. Eight of the top 16 seeds advanced while three of the bottom 16 seeds advanced including #63 Patton Kizzire. Eleven Americans advance to the round of 16.

Final 16 bracket

Notes: Round of 16

There were three upsets: #1 Jordan Spieth lost to #16 Louis Oosthuizen, 4 & 2; #52 Rafa Cabrera-Bello won when #27 An Byeong-hun conceded the match after 12 holes due to a neck injury (Cabrera-Bello was leading 4 up); #54 Chris Kirk defeated #30 Bill Haas, 2 & 1. Three of the top-8 seeds remained. Spieth's loss means that Day regains the world number one position.

Quarterfinals

There were two upsets: #16 Oosthuizen defeated #8 Dustin Johnson, 2 & 1, and #52 Cabrera-Bello defeated #45 Ryan Moore, 2 & 1. None of the 11 Americans in the round of 16 made the semifinals.

Breakdown by country

Prize money breakdown

 Source:

References

External links

Coverage on the European Tour's official site
Austin Country Club

WGC Match Play
Golf in Texas
Sports in Austin, Texas
WGC-Dell Match Play Championship
WGC-Dell Match Play Championship
WGC-Dell Match Play Championship
WGC-Dell Match Play Championship